The Elite 90 Award or more formally The Elite 90 Academic Recognition Award Program, originally the Elite 88 Award and later the Elite 89 Award, is an award by the National Collegiate Athletic Association (NCAA) recognizing the student athlete with the highest cumulative grade-point average who has reached the competition at the finals site for each of the NCAA's 90 men's and women's championships across its three divisions (Division I, Division II, Division III).

Students are eligible if they have achieved at least a sophomore in academic and athletic standing and if he or she is in at least the second year of competition (in any sport) at his or her current institution. A student in the first season of play at a new institution is eligible for the award if he or she sat out the previous season due to NCAA transfer rules while enrolled continuously at the current institution. The student athlete must be on the active roster, and in sports that have limits on squad size, must be a member of the designated squad size at the championship site. Grade point averages are determined using a straight grading scale to ensure consistency among institutions. Additionally, only credits earned at the student's current institution are counted toward determining GPA; transfer and AP credits are specifically excluded. Graduate students who still have athletic eligibility may receive the award, but only undergraduate GPA is considered. In the event of a tie, completed credits is the official tiebreaker. In sports such as golf and cross country running an individual who qualifies for the individual championship although his or her team is not competing will be eligible for the award. Multi-sport athletes are only allowed to win one award per academic year, even if they would qualify for the award in more than one sport.

The award was established as the Elite 88 Award during the 2009–10 academic year. It became the Elite 89 during the 2011–12 academic year with the creation of the NCAA Men's Division III Volleyball Championship, and changed again to Elite 90 in 2015–16 with the establishment of the NCAA Beach Volleyball Championship. The NCAA owns the trademark to the terms "Elite 89" and "Elite 90".

Two groups of NCAA student-athletes are not eligible for the Elite 90 Award:
 Participants in what the NCAA classifies as "emerging sports" for women, currently equestrianism, rugby union, and triathlon. These sports are recognized by the NCAA, but do not yet have fully sanctioned status. Beach volleyball had been an "emerging sport" before becoming a fully sanctioned championship sport in 2015–16.
 Players in Division I FBS football. The NCAA has never sponsored an official FBS national championship.

NCAA Elite 90 Eligible Sports

Notes
 "National Collegiate" is the official NCAA designation for championships that are open to schools from multiple NCAA divisions. In most cases, the National Collegiate Championship is the only championship awarded in that sport. However, two sports—women's ice hockey and men's volleyball—have National Collegiate and Division III championships. By contrast, the men's ice hockey championships are designated as "Division I" and "Division III", although Division II schools can and do compete in that sport's Division I championship as Division I members.
 The list includes only championships in fully sanctioned NCAA sports.

Notes

External links
Official web listing

Awards established in 2009
College sports trophies and awards in the United States
Student athlete awards in the United States
NCAA awards